Banning Lewis Academy are the two schools consisting of Banning Lewis Ranch Academy and Banning Lewis Preparatory Academy which are tuition free public charter schools serving approximately 1500 students in Colorado Springs, Colorado. The upper school campus opened in August 2017. BLPA now includes grades 6-8 for Middle School and grades 9-12 for High School. The schools are located in the Banning Lewis Ranch neighborhood, which was built years later after the original school opened. For enrolling in the school, admission is usually done by lottery. The school's mascot is a stallion.

History
The school originally first opened in August 2006. BLRA had originally hosted elementary and middle school students, until the 2017-2018 year when they opened a secondary school. For a time, the Banning Lewis School Board contracted the management of the school to Mosaica Education. Accel Schools took over responsibility for the charter management contract.

Athletics
The school offers football, volleyball, cross country, basketball, track & field, and soccer.

References

Educational institutions established in 2006
Public high schools in Colorado
Schools in El Paso County, Colorado
2006 establishments in Colorado
Charter schools in Colorado